The 1958 United States Senate election in Minnesota took place on November 4, 1958. Democratic U.S. Representative Eugene McCarthy defeated incumbent Republican U.S. Senator Edward John Thye, who sought a third term. With his victory, McCarthy became the first Democrat ever to be popularly elected to Minnesota's Class 1 Senate seat.

Democratic–Farmer–Labor primary
 Eugene J. McCarthy, U.S. Representative from Minnesota's 4th congressional district since 1949
 Hans R. Miller
 Hjalmar Petersen, 23rd Governor of Minnesota (1936-1937) and 28th Lieutenant Governor of Minnesota (1935-1936)

Republican primary
 Mrs. Peder P. Schmidt
 Edward C. Slettedahl
 Edward John Thye, Incumbent U.S. Senator since 1947

General election

See also 
 1958 United States Senate elections

References

Minnesota
1958
1958 Minnesota elections